Reginald Weaver was an Australian politician. It is also the name of:

Reginald Weaver (footballer) (1905–1970), English footballer
Reg Weaver, American labor leader